Lee Yoon-Sub  (born 30 July 1979) is a South Korean football player.

External links 

1979 births
Living people
South Korean footballers
South Korean expatriate footballers
Ulsan Hyundai FC players
Gimcheon Sangmu FC players
Qingdao Hainiu F.C. (1990) players
Shenyang Dongjin players
Ulsan Hyundai Mipo Dockyard FC players
K League 1 players
Korea National League players
Chinese Super League players
China League One players
Expatriate footballers in China
South Korean expatriate sportspeople in China
Association football midfielders
Sportspeople from North Chungcheong Province